Boston City Council elections were held on November 2, 1999. Eleven seats (seven district representatives and four at-large members) were contested in the general election, as the incumbents for districts 1 and 2 ran unopposed. Ten seats (six districts and the four at-large members) had also been contested in the preliminary election held on September 21, 1999.

At-large
Councillors Francis Roache, Stephen J. Murphy, and Peggy Davis-Mullen were re-elected. Councillor Dapper O'Neil, a member of the council since 1971, lost his seat to Michael F. Flaherty.

District 1
Councillor Paul Scapicchio ran unopposed and was re-elected.

District 2
Councillor James M. Kelly ran unopposed and was re-elected.

District 3
Councillor Maureen Feeney was re-elected.

District 4
Councillor Charles Yancey was re-elected.

District 5
Councillor Daniel F. Conley was re-elected.

District 6
Councillor Maura Hennigan was re-elected.

District 7
Councillor Gareth R. Saunders had announced in June 1999 that he would not seek re-election; his seat was won by Chuck Turner.

District 8
Councillor Thomas M. Keane Jr. had announced in March 1999 that he would not seek re-election; his seat was won by Michael P. Ross, who defeated Suzanne Iannella, daughter of former council president Christopher A. Iannella and sister of former council member Richard P. Iannella.

District 9
Councillor Brian Honan was re-elected.

See also
 List of members of Boston City Council

References

Further reading
 
 

City Council election
Boston City Council elections
Boston City Council election
Boston City Council